A Rock and Roll Alternative is an album by the Southern rock band Atlanta Rhythm Section, released in 1976. This album includes the band's biggest hit, "So in to You", which peaked at number 7 on the Billboard Hot 100 and number 11 on the Easy Listening chart.

Track listing
"Sky High" (Buie, Daughtry, Hammond, Nix) – 5:17
"Hitch-Hikers' Hero" (Buie, Nix) – 3:38
"Don't Miss the Message" (Buie, Cobb, Nix) – 3:27
"Georgia Rhythm" (Buie, Cobb, Nix) – 4:52
"So in to You" (Buie, Daughtry, Nix) – 4:20
"Outside Woman Blues" (Blind Joe Reynolds) – 4:53
"Everybody Gotta Go" (Buie, Daughtry, Nix) – 4:10
"Neon Nites" (Buie, Nix) – 3:57

Personnel
Ronnie Hammond – vocals, background vocals
Barry Bailey – guitar
J.R. Cobb – rhythm guitar, background vocals
Dean Daughtry – keyboards
Paul Goddard – bass guitar
Robert Nix – percussion, drums, vocals, background vocals

Production
Producer: Buddy Buie
Associate producers: J.R. Cobb, Robert Nix
Engineer: Rodney Mills
Mixing: Rodney Mills
Remixing: Suha Gur
Design: Mike McCarty
Art direction: Buddy Buie, Mike McCarty
Photography: Jim Wiggins

Charts
Album

Singles

Certifications

References

Atlanta Rhythm Section albums
1976 albums
Albums produced by Buddy Buie
Polydor Records albums